Jiří Sobotka (also known as Georges Sobotka; 6 June 1911 – 20 May 1994) was a Czech football player and manager. He played internationally for Czechoslovakia.

Career
Sobotka played for Czechoslovakia national football team (23 caps, 8 goals) and participated at the 1934 FIFA World Cup when Czechoslovakia came in second.

He played for Slavia Prague, Hajduk Split (winning the Banovina of Croatia first league) and FC La Chaux-de-Fonds.

During his period in Split, he played 36 league matches scoring 17 goals in the 1939-40 and 1940-41 seasons. Before arriving to Yugoslavia, he had been a player-coach in Switzerland with FC Winterthur.

After his playing career, he coached numerous clubs in Switzerland and won 6 Swiss cups. He also coached Charleroi in Belgium UE Sant Andreu in Spain, and Switzerland national team.

Curiosity
A well-documented curiosity was the fact that during the winter break of their 1963–64 season FC Basel travelled on a world tour. This saw them visit British Hong Kong, Malaysia, Singapore, Australia, New Zealand, French Polynesia, Mexico and the United States. As first team manager Sobotka was together with 16 players and 15 members of staff, supporters and journalists participated in this world tour from 10 January to 10 February 1964. Team captain Bruno Michaud filmed the events with his super-8 camara. The voyage around the world included 19 flights and numerous bus and train journeys. Club chairman, Lucien Schmidlin, led the group, but as they arrived in the hotel in Bangkok, he realised that 250,000 Swiss Francs were missing. The suitcase that he had filled with the various currencies was not with them. He had left it at home, but fortunately Swiss Air were able to deliver this to him within just a few days. During the tour a total of ten friendly/test games were played, these are listed in their 1963–64 season. Five wins, three draws, two defeats, but also three major injuries resulted from these test matches. A broken leg for Peter Füri, an eye injury for Walter Baumann and a knee injury for Bruno Michaud soon reduced the number of players to just 13.

Honours

As a player
Slavia Prague
 Czechoslovak First League: 1932–33, 1933–34, 1934–35, 1936–37

Hajduk Split
 Croatian First League: 1940–41

Czechoslovakia
 FIFA World Cup runner-up: 1934

As a manager
Chaux-de-Fonds
 Swiss Championship: 1953–54, 1954–55
 Swiss Cup: 1947–48, 1950–51, 1953–54, 1954–55, 1956–57

Feyenoord
 Eredivisie: 1960–61

FC Basel
 Swiss Cup: 1962–63

References

External links

 Profile at CMFS
 
 Career story at Hajduk Split official website. 

1911 births
1994 deaths
Czechoslovak footballers
Czechoslovakia international footballers
Czech footballers
SK Slavia Prague players
FC Fastav Zlín players
HNK Hajduk Split players
FC Aarau managers
1934 FIFA World Cup players
Czechoslovak football managers
Czech football managers
FC La Chaux-de-Fonds managers
Feyenoord managers
FC Basel managers
HNK Hajduk Split managers
AC Bellinzona managers
UE Sant Andreu managers
FC Biel-Bienne managers
Czechoslovak expatriate sportspeople in Switzerland
Expatriate football managers in Yugoslavia
Expatriate footballers in Yugoslavia
Yugoslav First League players
Czechoslovak expatriate sportspeople in Yugoslavia
Czechoslovak expatriate sportspeople in Italy
Czechoslovak expatriate sportspeople in Spain
Footballers from Prague
Eredivisie managers
Expatriate football managers in Belgium
Expatriate football managers in the Netherlands
Expatriate football managers in Spain
Expatriate football managers in Switzerland
Czechoslovak expatriate sportspeople in the Netherlands
Czechoslovak expatriate sportspeople in Belgium
Czechoslovak expatriate footballers
Association football forwards
Czech expatriate football managers
People from the Kingdom of Bohemia